Amanush may refer to:
 Amanush (1975 film), an Indian action drama film
 Amanush (2010 film), an Indian Bengali-language romantic thriller drama film